The West Martello Tower (also known as the Key West Garden Club) is a historic martello tower in Key West, Florida, United States. It is located at 1100 Atlantic Boulevard. On June 24, 1976, it was added to the U.S. National Register of Historic Places.

West Martello Tower was completed, during the American Civil War. It saw no battle action, though was used as a target.

References

References and external links

 Monroe County listings at National Register of Historic Places
 Florida's Office of Cultural and Historical Programs
 Historical reference
 Monroe County listings 
 West Martello Tower and Garden Center

Towers completed in 1862
Buildings and structures in Key West, Florida
Landmarks in Key West, Florida
Forts in Key West, Florida
History of Key West, Florida
National Register of Historic Places in Key West, Florida
Tourist attractions in Key West, Florida
Martello towers
Martello, West
1862 establishments in Florida